Robert Treat Paine (October 28, 1835 – August 11, 1910) was a Boston lawyer, philanthropist and social reformer and great-grandson of the signer of the Declaration of Independence. An alumnus of Boston Latin School, he is most widely known for his work as chairman of the building committee of Boston's Trinity Church in Copley Square, for his leadership of 19th century Boston philanthropists, for his summer home in Waltham, Massachusetts, and for his experiments in building housing for low-and middle-income workers.

Paine's brick row-house development on Greenwich and Sussex streets in Roxbury, Massachusetts is listed on the National Register of Historic Places as part of the Frederick Douglass Square Historic District. Another of his housing experiments, an 1890s 100-house subdivision between Round Hill and Sunnyside streets in Jamaica Plain, has been deemed eligible for nomination to the National Register.

See also 
 Robert Treat Paine Estate (known as Stonehurst) in Waltham, Massachusetts, a collaboration between Henry Hobson Richardson and Frederick Law Olmsted
 Colonial ancestor Maj. Robert Treat, a Governor of the Connecticut Colony. Was one of the principal founders of Newark, New Jersey

References
 Stonehurst, the Robert Treat Paine Estate
 Charles Henry, ed.  Paine Ancestry: The Family of Robert Treat Paine.  Boston: David Clapp & Son, 1912.
 Round Hill-Sunnyside Streets proposed National Register historic district in Jamaica Plain, Massachusetts

1835 births
1910 deaths
Lawyers from Boston
American social reformers
Roxbury Latin School alumni
19th-century American lawyers
19th-century American philanthropists